Saman Khuda (Saman Khoda, Saman-khudat) was an 8th-century Iranian noble whose descendants (the House of Saman) later became rulers of Khurasan (the Samanid Empire). He was a Dehqan from the village of Saman in Balkh province in present-day northern Afghanistan. In the early 8th century, he came to Merv, seat of the Caliphal governor of Khorasan, Asad ibn 'Abd Allah al-Qasri (ruled 723-727). Saman was originally a Zoroastrian. However, he was so impressed with the piety of Asad ibn 'Abd-Allah al-Qasri, that he converted to Islam. He named his son Asad, allegedly in the governor's honor.

Caliph al-Mamun (786-833) subsequently appointed Asad's four sons – Saman Khuda's grandsons – as governors of Samarkand, Ferghana, Shash and Ustrushana, and Herat in recognition of their role in the suppression of a revolt. This began the House of Saman; Saman Khuda's great-grandson Isma'il ibn Ahmad (849-907) became Amir of Transoxiana and Khorasan.

Saman was a 4th or 5th generation descendant of Bahram Chobin, a noble of the ancient House of Mihran, who played an important role in the history of the later Sassanian Empire.

Family tree

References

Sources
 

Samanids
Converts to Islam from Zoroastrianism
8th-century monarchs in Asia
People from Balkh Province
People from Balkh
Year of death unknown
Year of birth unknown
8th-century Iranian people
Dehqans